This was the first edition of the tournament.

Valentin Vacherot won the title after defeating Lý Hoàng Nam 6–3, 7–6(7–4) in the final.

Seeds

Draw

Finals

Top half

Bottom half

References

External links
Main draw
Qualifying draw

Nonthaburi Challenger - 1